Recomposed by Max Richter: Vivaldi – The Four Seasons is a composition by contemporary classical composer Max Richter. The piece is a complete recomposition and reinterpretation of Vivaldi's violin concertos The Four Seasons.
Although Richter said that he had discarded 75 percent of Vivaldi's original material, the parts he does use are phased and looped, emphasising his grounding in postmodern and minimalist music.

A version by Daniel Hope (violin) with the Konzerthausorchester Berlin under the direction of André de Ridder was released on August 31, 2012 on Universal Classics and Jazz (Germany), a division of Universal Music Group, and Deutsche Grammophon, prior to its first live performance. It has since been recorded by other artists.

Premieres in the concert hall
Richter's recomposed version of Vivaldi's The Four Seasons was premiered in the UK at the Barbican Centre on 31 October 2012, performed by the Britten Sinfonia, conducted by André de Ridder, with violinist Daniel Hope.  
The US launch concert in New York at Le Poisson Rouge was recorded by NPR and streamed live.

Discography
The Deutsche Grammophon album was played by the violinist Daniel Hope and the Konzerthaus Kammerorchester Berlin symphony orchestra, and conducted by André de Ridder. On the album, Hope plays the "Ex-Lipinski" violin, an instrument made by Giuseppe Guarneri del Gesù in 1742 and made available to the violinist by a German family who asked to remain anonymous. The album topped the iTunes classical chart in the UK, Germany, and the US.

The Rubicon Classics recording features soloist Fenella Humphreys and the Covent Garden Sinfonia, conducted by Ben Palmer. Humphreys recorded using a violin from the circle of Peter Guarneri of Venice, made in 1727.

Richter recorded a new version of the Four Seasons in 2022 alongside violinist Elena Urioste and the Chineke! Orchestra and released it as The New Four Seasons – Vivaldi Recomposed.

Critical reception
Recomposed by Max Richter: Vivaldi – The Four Seasons received widespread acclaim from contemporary classical music critics.

Ivan Hewett of The Telegraph gave the album a very positive review, stating:As you would expect of a composer who once studied with the great modernist Luciano Berio, Richter is very self-aware. He notices that his own taste in repeating patterns doesn’t mesh with the apparently similar patterns in Vivaldi. They obey a different logic, and the friction between them generates a fascinatingly ambiguous colour. Richter teases out and heightens this colour, sometimes with Vivaldi uppermost, sometimes himself. It is a subtle and often moving piece of work, which suggests that after years of tedious disco and trance versions of Mozart, the field of the classical remix has finally become interesting.

Track listing

Personnel
Main personnel

 Max Richter – composer, mixing, producer, quotation author
 André de Ridder – conductor
 Daniel Hope – primary artist, violin 
 Raphael Alpermann – harpsichord
 Konzerthaus Kammerorchester Berlin – orchestra
 Alexander Kahl – cello
 David Drost – cello
 Nerina Mancini – cello
 Ying Guo – cello
 Ernst-Martin Schmidt – viola
 Felix Korinth – viola
 Katja Plagens – viola
 Matthias Benker – viola
 Alicia Lagger – violin 
 Christoph Kulicke – violin 
 Karoline Bestehorn – violin 
 Sayako Kusaka – violin , concertmaster
 Cornelia Dill – violin 
 Jana Krämer – violin 
 Johannes Jahnel – violin 
 Ulrike Töppen – violin 
 Ronith Mues – harp
 Georg Schwärsky – double bass
 Jorge Villar Paredes – double bass
 Sandor Tar – double bass

Additional personnel
 Antonio Vivaldi – original material
 Felix Feustel – product manager
 Neil Hutchinson – recording engineer, mixing
 Christian Kellersmann – original concept
 Nick Kimberley – liner notes
 Götz-Michael Rieth – mastering engineer
 Mandy Parnell – mastering engineer
 Matthias Schneider – project manager
 Erik Weiss – photography
 Jenni Whiteside – editing
 Double Standards – art direction

Charts

References

2012 albums
Deutsche Grammophon albums
Max Richter albums